The Optical Storage Technology Association (OSTA) was an international trade association formed to promote the use of recordable optical data storage technologies and products. It was responsible for the creation and maintenance of the Universal Disk Format (UDF) file system specification (derived from ISO/IEC 13346 and ECMA-167), which was notably adopted for DVD-Video. It was incorporated in California in 1992 and dissolved in 2018.

In the autumn of 2007, OSTA spearheaded a campaign to encourage families and photographers to back up their digital photographs on compact discs.

External links
 OSTA
 Understanding Recordable & Rewritable DVD
 Understanding CD-R & CD-RW
 Running Optimum Power Control: Data Integrity in CD-Recording

Technology trade associations
International organizations based in the United States
Organizations based in California
Optical computer storage